Clarke James Roycroft (born 15 March 1950) is an Australian equestrian. He is the third and youngest son of Bill Roycroft, an Olympic equestrian gold medallist, and his wife, Mavis. He competed in two events at the 1972 Summer Olympics. His brothers Barry Roycroft and Wayne Roycroft are also Olympians. After the Olympics he concentrated on his business ventures; in 2005 he was running a farm and Stock and station agency in the family's hometown of Camperdown. He has four children to Judy, whom he married around the time of the Olympics. In 2000, he received an Australian Sports Medal.

References

External links
 

1950 births
Living people
Australian male equestrians
Olympic equestrians of Australia
Equestrians at the 1972 Summer Olympics
Sportsmen from Victoria (Australia)
Recipients of the Australian Sports Medal
Place of birth missing (living people)
20th-century Australian people